Snaggletooths or stareaters are any of a number of small, deep-sea stomiid fish in the genus Astronesthes. They possess a bioluminescent red chin barbel that the fish use as a lure to attract small prey into striking distance.

The fish have delicate skin, and mouths filled with sharp, needlelike, curved teeth.

Species
There are currently 48 recognized species in this genus:

 Astronesthes atlanticus Parin & Borodulina, 1996
 Astronesthes bilobatus Parin & Borodulina, 1996 (Twinlobe snaggletooth)
 Astronesthes boulengeri Gilchrist, 1902 (Boulenger's snaggletooth)
 Astronesthes caulophorus Regan & Trewavas, 1929
 Astronesthes chrysophekadion (Bleeker, 1849)
 Astronesthes cyaneus (A. B. Brauer, 1902)
 Astronesthes decoratus Parin & Borodulina, 2002
 Astronesthes dupliglandis Parin & Borodulina, 1997
 Astronesthes exsul Parin & Borodulina, 2002 (Exile snaggletooth)
 Astronesthes fedorovi Parin & Borodulina, 1994
 Astronesthes formosana Y. C. Liao, L. S. Chen & K. T. Shao, 2006
 Astronesthes galapagensis Parin, Borodulina & Hulley, 1999
 Astronesthes gemmifer Goode & T. H. Bean, 1896
 Astronesthes gibbsi Borodulina, 1992
 Astronesthes gudrunae Parin & Borodulina, 2002
 Astronesthes haplophos Parin & Borodulina, 2002
 Astronesthes ijimai S. Tanaka (I), 1908 (Ijima's snaggletooth)
 Astronesthes illuminatus Parin, Borodulina & Hulley, 1999
 Astronesthes indicus A. B. Brauer, 1902 (Black snaggletooth)
 Astronesthes indopacificus Parin & Borodulina, 1997 (Indo-Pacific snaggletooth)
 Astronesthes karsteni Parin & Borodulina, 2002
 Astronesthes kreffti Gibbs & McKinney, 1988 (Krefft's snaggletooth)
 Astronesthes lamellosus Goodyear & Gibbs, 1970
 Astronesthes lampara Parin & Borodulina, 1998
 Astronesthes leucopogon Regan & Trewavas, 1929
 Astronesthes lucibucca Parin & Borodulina, 1996
 Astronesthes lucifer C. H. Gilbert, 1905 (Pacific astronesthid fish)
 Astronesthes luetkeni Regan & Trewavas, 1929
 Astronesthes lupina Whitley, 1941 (Little wolf)
 Astronesthes macropogon Goodyear & Gibbs, 1970
 Astronesthes martensii Klunzinger, 1871
 Astronesthes micropogon Goodyear & Gibbs, 1970
 Astronesthes neopogon Regan & Trewavas, 1929
 Astronesthes niger J. Richardson, 1845
 Astronesthes nigroides Gibbs & Aron, 1960
 Astronesthes oligoa Parin & Borodulina, 2002
 Astronesthes psychrolutes (Gibbs & S. H. Weitzman, 1965) (Temperate snaggletooth)
 Astronesthes quasiindicus Parin & Borodulina, 1996
 Astronesthes richardsoni (Poey, 1852) (Richardson's snaggletooth)
 Astronesthes similus A. E. Parr, 1927
 Astronesthes spatulifer Gibbs & McKinney, 1988
 Astronesthes splendidus A. B. Brauer, 1902 (Splendid snaggletooth)
 Astronesthes tanibe Parin & Borodulina, 2001
 Astronesthes tatyanae Parin & Borodulina, 1998
 Astronesthes tchuvasovi Parin & Borodulina, 1996
 Astronesthes trifibulatus Gibbs, Amaoka & Haruka, 1984 (Triplethread snaggletooth)
 Astronesthes zetgibbsi Parin & Borodulina, 1997
 Astronesthes zharovi Parin & Borodulina, 1998

References

Stomiidae